Collins College may refer to:

 Collins College (Arizona), a for-profit college that moved from Tempe to Phoenix, Arizona prior to closing in 2016
 The Collins College of Hospitality Management, a hospitality management college in the city of Pomona, California and one of the eight colleges forming part of Cal Poly Pomona

See also 
 Collin College, a community college district in the  Dallas–Fort Worth–Arlington metropolitan area in Texas